Municipal Buildings is former council facility that is being converted into a hotel, on Dale Street, Liverpool, England. It is a Grade II* listed building.

History
The building was built by the town council to accommodate the growing number of administrative staff. Work was started in 1862 by Liverpool Corporation surveyor John Weightman, and finished by Edward Robert Robson in 1868. The building was put up for sale by the council in 2016 as it was deemed "surplus to requirements" and too expensive to run and maintain.

In January 2016, it was announced that Singapore-based property developer Fragrance Group had bought the building and were planning on turning it into a 4-star hotel. The remaining 640 council staff currently working in the building were moved to other offices within the city ahead of the sale. Work began in autumn 2020. The project is worth £40 million, and involves the creation of a four storey extension at the back of the building, allowing the facility to have a pool, spa, gym and space for 179 suites for guests.

Architecture
The building has three storeys and is built of stone with a lead roof. The design of the building was influenced by both Italian and French Renaissance. Around the balcony are sixteen sandstone figures representing the arts, sciences and industries of Liverpool. In the centre of the building is the tower, with its balconies, clocks and five bells. The four quarter bells are hung for English-style Change Ringing. A two-stage pyramidal spire is situated on the top the tower.

Gallery of Statues

See also
Liverpool Town Hall
Municipal Annexe
Architecture of Liverpool

References

External links
Picture
Walking Book

Government buildings completed in 1868
Grade II* listed government buildings
Grade II* listed buildings in Liverpool
City and town halls in Merseyside
Liverpool City Council
1868 establishments in England